Bambini may refer to:

 Bambini, short movie by Francesco Maselli
 Giorgio Bambini, Italian boxer
 Jacopo Bambini, Italian painter
 Niccolò Bambini, Italian painter